Cimdenieki is a small suburban settlement in Grobiņa Parish, South Kurzeme Municipality in the Courland region of Latvia. The river Ālande flows through Cimdenieki.

Cimdenieki is mostly known for its proximity to Liepāja International Airport.

References 

Villages in Latvia
South Kurzeme Municipality
Courland